OpenOffice or open office may refer to:

Computing

Software
 OpenOffice.org (OOo), a discontinued open-source office software suite, originally based on StarOffice
 Apache OpenOffice (AOO), a derivative of OOo by the Apache Software Foundation, with contribution from IBM Lotus Symphony

Programming
 OpenOffice Basic (formerly known as StarOffice Basic or StarBasic or OOoBasic), a dialect of the programming language BASIC

File formats
 OpenDocument format (ODF), also known as Open Document Format for Office Applications, a widely supported  standard XML-based file format originating from OOo 
 OpenOffice.org XML, a file format used by early versions of OpenOffice.org
 Office Open XML (OOXML), a competing file format from Microsoft

Other uses
 Open plan, a floor plan
 Open Document Architecture (ODA), document interchange format (CCITT T.411-T.424, equivalent to ISO 8613)
 OpenDoc, an abandoned multi-platform standard for compound documents, intended as an alternative to Microsoft's Object Linking and Embedding (OLE)